Kouassi-Kouassikro is a town in central Ivory Coast. It is a sub-prefecture of and the seat of Kouassi-Kouassikro Department in N'Zi Region, Lacs District. Kouassi-Kouassikro is also a commune.

In 2014, the population of the sub-prefecture of Kouassi-Kouassikro was 23,117.

Villages
The 19 villages of the sub-prefecture of Kouassi-Kouassikro and their population in 2014 are:

References

Sub-prefectures of N'Zi Region
Communes of N'Zi Region